Alexander "Sasha" Lubotsky (born 16 April 1956) is a Russian linguist and Indologist who specializes in the study of Indo-Iranian languages. He is the editor-in-chief of the Leiden Indo-European Etymological Dictionary project.

In 2011, he published The Indo-Aryan Inherited Lexicon, a list of inherited Old Indo-Aryan words along with their Proto-Indo-Iranian ancestor forms.

Biography 
Alexander Lubotsky was born in Moscow, Russian SFSR. His father was the violinist Mark Lubotsky. He studied linguistics at Lomonosov University (now Moscow State University) between 1973 and 1976, then Indo-Iranian languages at Leiden University from 1976 to 1980. He earned a BA in Indo-Iranian in 1978, a MA in Comparative Indo-European Linguistics in 1980, then in PhD in Linguistics from Leiden in 1987, following a thesis on the "Nominal accentuation in Sanskrit and Indo-European" under the supervision of Robert S. P. Beekes.

Since 1999, he has been a full professor of Comparative Indo-European Linguistics at Leiden University. Since 1992, he has been the editor-in-chief of the Leiden Studies in Indo-European series, the director of the Leiden Summer School in Languages and Linguistics since 2006, and a member of the editorial board of Brill's studies in Indo-European Languages & Linguistics since 2008.

Lubotsky is a member of the Royal Netherlands Academy of Arts and Sciences since 2003. He has supervised the PhD dissertations of Michiel de Vaan (2002), Sergei Starostin (honorary degree, 2005), and Guus Kroonen (2009).

References 

1956 births
Living people
Academic staff of Leiden University
Linguists from Russia
Linguists of Indo-European languages
Russian people of Jewish descent
Members of the Royal Netherlands Academy of Arts and Sciences